"Hé oh" is a song by French rapper Gambi released in 2019. The song topped the singles chart in France and was Gambi's first single to reach number one.

Charts

Certifications

References 

2019 singles
2019 songs
French-language songs
French hip hop songs